The People's Party was a conservative political party in Montenegro.

History
The party was established in 1990, after a multi-party system was introduced in Montenegro, and was named after the historical People's Party. Notable party founders include Novak Kilibarda, Matija Bećković, Božidar Bojović, Pavle Milić, Jovan Markuš, Dragan Šoć, Momir Vojvodić and Bogoljub Šijaković.

The People's Party opposed Slobodan Milošević's regime in Serbia and his supporters in Montenegro during the 1990s. It joined DPS and SDP in 1998 election, and it participated in Government with the two until 2001. But, when DPS and SDP openly stated that they are proponents of full Montenegrin independence. People's Party of Montenegro left the coalition and the Government. Afterwards, it was mostly in coalition with pro-union with Serbia parties. After the referendum, the People's Party refused to acknowledge the result due to allegations of irregularities. After failing to achieve parliamentary status in 2009 and 2012 elections, People's Party activity significantly decreased, but it remained formally active until its dissolution in 2017.

Elections

Party leadership
Novak Kilibarda, 1990–2000
Dragan Šoć, 2000–2006
Predrag Popović, 2006–2017
Jovan Markuš, 2011–2016

References

Serb political parties in Montenegro
Eastern Orthodox political parties
Political parties established in 1990
1990 establishments in Montenegro
Conservative parties in Montenegro
Christian democratic parties in Montenegro